Denver Center for International Studies at Baker, or simply DCIS Baker, is a public 6-12 magnet school located in the Baker neighborhood of Denver, Colorado. It is part of the Denver Public Schools system. DCIS was created in 1985 as a magnet program at Denver West High School and became an independent magnet middle and high school in 2006 at the Baker location.

Mission and Values

School Mission
"Denver Center for International Studies prepares students for college and career by developing multilingual, interculturally competent citizens who are actively involved in our rapidly changing world."

Values
As a part of DCIS Baker's focus, students are encouraged to practice the school's Core Values and Leadership Domains. Students are expected to create a portfolio that reflects how the student met these categories in order to graduate.

Students at DCIS Baker who meet the Denver Public Schools requirements for graduating will receive a DPS diploma. However, the school offers a second diploma, the DCIS Diploma of International Studies, which is earned by students that complete additional requirements, such as creating a portfolio that reflect the school's values. The second diploma is useful for students planning to continue education at university, as it is an additional accomplishment to include on college applications.

Core Values
Integrity
High Expectations
Diversity
Collaboration
Reflection

Leadership Domains
Investigate the World — Generate Global Knowledge
Recognize Perspectives — Apply Cross-Cultural Understanding
Communicate Ideas — Connect and Collaborate Across Boundaries
Take Action — Enact Global Solutions

History
Dr. Dan Lutz created the concept of an internationally focused school at Denver West High School as a magnet program in 1985. The core idea of the program centered around a globally-focused curriculum that would offer multiple languages and opportunities to travel and experience other cultures. At Denver West High School, the program was originally named the Center for International Studies. In 1997, the DCIS Foundation was established as a 501(c)(3) organization to raise funds to make travel more accessible for a growing and diverse student population.

In 2006, the DCIS program relocated from Denver West High School to nearby vacant Baker Middle School. The building was renovated to meet the needs of the new school, and the doors of DCIS Baker opened for students in fall 2006.

The Denver Public Schools Board of Education later expanded the DCIS network to three other campuses: two elementary schools (DCIS Ford and DCIS Fairmont) and another 6-12 school (DCIS Montbello). These DCIS schools are the only DPS members of the International Studies Schools Network (ISSN), which is part of the Asia Society.

On March 4, 2016, the school was evacuated after an individual called 911 and falsely claimed that they had placed bombs in the school. Tactical teams and bomb-sniffing dogs were brought in, and no explosive devices were found in or near the school. Classes were cancelled for the remainder of the day.

Demographics
As of the 2021–2022 school year, DCIS Baker has a total enrollment of 672 students in grades six through twelve.

 Hispanic/Latino: 62%
 White: 23%
 African American/Black: 5%
 Asian & Pacific Islander: 4%
 Multiple Races: 3%
 American Indian: 2%
 Unspecified: 1%
Low-Income Students: 61%

Athletics
The athletic teams of DCIS Baker are known as the Phoenix. The school fields a variety of sports for middle school students, but does not offer any high school athletics due to a lack of facilities.

Due to the school's history and proximity to Denver West High School, high school student athletes at DCIS Baker are able to join West's athletic teams. DCIS Baker students account for approximately 20% of West's athletic rosters.

References

Further reading
DCIS Baker
Schoolmint
US News
National Center for Education Studies
DCIS Foundation
9News
The Denver Channel
CBS Denver

High schools in Denver
Schools in Denver
Educational institutions established in 2006
Public high schools in Colorado